Hidden is a British television drama starring Philip Glenister, Thekla Reuten, Anna Chancellor, Michael Winder, Andrew Scarborough and David Suchet, which debuted on BBC One on 6 October 2011. The four-part series was directed by Niall MacCormick, produced by Christopher Hall, and written by Ronan Bennett in collaboration with Walter Bernstein.

Overview
Small-time solicitor Harry Venn (Glenister) is reluctantly drawn back into his dark past after being approached by Gina Hawkes (Reuten). Hawkes, a lawyer searching for a missing alibi witness for her client, quickly draws Venn into a deep and dangerous conspiracy involving the death of his brother twenty years previously, and which reaches deep into the heart of the British political system.

Cast
 Philip Glenister as Harry Venn
 Thekla Reuten as Gina Hawkes
 David Suchet as Sir Nigel Fountain
 Thomas Craig as D.I. Fenton Russell
 Anna Chancellor as Elspeth Verney
 Andrew Scarborough as Ben Lander
 Matthew Marsh as James Morpeth
 Bertie Carvel as Alexander Wentworth
 Richard Dormer as Frank Hanna
 Paul Ritter as Stevie Quirke
 Peter Guinness as Jason Styles
 Ben Smith as Matt Grogan
 David Michaels as Brian Worsley
 Christopher Fairbank as George Venn
 Rupert Simonian as Michael Venn
 Mark Powley as Mark Venn
 Lisa Kay as Lauren Chisholm
 Michael Winder as Kevin Gaunt
 Mark Flitton as Paul Hillman
 Christov Ruhn as Mezwar Tanzir
 Audrey Looten as Jennifer Moscati
 Mens-Sana Tamakloe as Dean Stubbs
 Christopher Webster as Young Harry Venn
 Seainin Brennan as Frances Martin
Marie-France Alvarez as Nadine

Episodes

Critical reception
Josephine Moulds of The Telegraph said of the series: "All in all it was terribly exciting. Less pretentious than Page Eight and more ambitious than Spooks, Hidden nailed the intelligent, pacy TV thriller."

References

External links

2011 British television series debuts
2011 British television series endings
2010s British drama television series
BBC high definition shows
BBC television dramas
2010s British crime television series
British thriller television series
2010s British television miniseries
English-language television shows
Television shows set in London
Television shows set in France
Television shows set in Northern Ireland